College Universitaire Caraibe ( C.U.C.) was founded in 1988 in Port-au-Prince, Haiti.  It is a school in Haiti affiliated with Université Caraïbe's College of Education.
 Has classes from Pre-school to High School.
 Approximately 350 students in attendance
 Approximately 35 Faculty and Staff
 Teaches students in Creole, French and English

References

External links 
 University of Caraibe Website 
 College Universitaire Caraibe Website 
 Haiti Schools 

Buildings and structures in Port-au-Prince
Educational institutions established in 1988
Schools in Haiti
1988 establishments in Haiti